James William McAndrew (June 29, 1862 – April 30, 1922) was a career officer in the United States Army. He attained the rank of major general, and was most notable for his service as chief of staff of the American Expeditionary Forces during World War I.

A native of Hawley, Pennsylvania, McAndrew graduated from the United States Military Academy in 1888 and was commissioned as a second lieutenant of Infantry.  His early assignments were in the western United States, and he took part in the Ghost Dance War of 1890-1891.  He served in Cuba during the Spanish–American War, including the Battle of El Caney and the Siege of Santiago, and in the Philippines during the Philippine–American War.

As McAndrew's career progressed, he completed the Army School of the Line (1910), Command and General Staff College (1911), and Army War College (1913).  At the start of World War I, he was promoted to colonel as commander of the 18th Infantry Regiment.  He commanded the regiment until he was promoted to temporary brigadier general as commander of 2nd Brigade, 1st Division.  After service as commandant of the American Expeditionary Forces Staff College in Langres, McAndrew was promoted to major general and assigned as AEF chief of staff.  He served in this position until the end of the war, and received credit for steps to improves the AEF staff's efficiency with respect to its planning process and preparation of operations orders.

After the war, McAndrew was assigned as commandant of the Army War College.  He suffered health problems brought on by overexerting himself during his AEF service, and died in Washington, D.C., on April 30, 1922.  He was buried at Arlington National Cemetery.

Early life
James William McAndrew was born in Hawley, Pennsylvania, on June 29, 1862, the son of John Richard and Eliza (Kane) McAndrew.  John McAndrew was employed in the Hawley office of the Pennsylvania Coal Company. McAndrew attended the schools of Hawley, and then St. Francis Xavier College in New York City. Appointed to the United States Military Academy (USMA) at West Point, New York, in 1884, he graduated 12th in his class in June 1888 and was commissioned a second lieutenant of Infantry. Among his classmates there were several men who would, like McAndrew himself, eventually attain the rank of general officer, such as Peyton C. March, William M. Morrow, William Robert Dashiell, Robert Lee Howze, Peter Charles Harris, Eli Alva Helmick, Henry Jervey Jr., William Voorhees Judson, John Louis Hayden, Edward Anderson, William H. Hart, Charles Aloysius Hedekin and William S. Peirce.

Start of career
Assigned to the 21st Infantry Regiment, McAndrew served initially in the western United States, and took part in the Ghost Dance War against the Sioux in 1890–1891. He was promoted to first lieutenant in 1894, and assigned to the 3rd Infantry. McAndrew served in Cuba during the Spanish–American War, and took part in the Battle of El Caney and the Siege of Santiago. In 1899, McAndrew was promoted to captain, and he served in the Philippines during the Philippine–American War. From 1905 to 1906, he served with the 3rd Infantry in Skagway, Alaska.

Later career
Andrews was an instructor at the Army Service Schools until 1909. He was an honor graduate of his Army School of the Line class in 1910, and graduated from the Command and General Staff College in 1911, after which he remained on the faculty and was promoted to major. In 1913 he graduated from the Army War College, after which he served on the Army staff at the War Department.  He was promoted to lieutenant colonel in 1916, and was appointed as commandant of the Army Service Schools.

World War I

Shortly after the American entry into World War I in April 1917, McAndrew was promoted to colonel and assigned as commander of the 18th Infantry. He led his regiment to France, and commanded it until he was promoted to temporary brigadier general in August 1917 and appointed to command 2nd Brigade, 1st Division.  He was then assigned as commandant of the American Expeditionary Forces Staff College in Langres, where in addition to the staff college, he organized the AEF School of the Line, Officer Candidate School, Infantry School, and Tank School in order to train soldiers for their combat duties.

In May 1918, AEF commander John J. Pershing named McAndrew to succeed James Harbord as AEF chief of staff. He was promoted to temporary major general while in this post, and served until June 1919. McAndrew was praised for the leadership and management style he brought to the AEF staff, including speeding up the planning process and preparation of operations orders by delegating as much authority as possible, including allowing senior staff officers to issue directives in Pershing's name when circumstances required it. Though his initiatives enabled the AEF staff to function more efficiently, they were also criticized for creating resentment between the AEF staff and subordinate army and corps commanders, who believed that their authority was being diminished.

Post-World War I
McAndrew was promoted to permanent brigadier general in November 1918. After serving with the post-war Army of Occupation in Germany, McAndrew returned to the United States in 1919 to become commandant of the Army War College. He was promoted to permanent major general in 1921.

Death and burial
McAndrew's exertions during World War I aggravated a heart condition, and he was often in ill health beginning in 1920. He died at Walter Reed Hospital in Washington, D.C., on April 30, 1922. His wife was with him at his death, as were two of his sisters, longtime friend Colonel James B. Gowen, and General Pershing. He was buried at Arlington National Cemetery, Section 3 Grave 2519.

Family
McAndrew's siblings included: Richard, who was ordained as a priest in 1877 and served for many years in Wilkes-Barre, Pennsylvania; Patrick, a career Army surgeon who attained the rank of colonel; Jane, the wife of Scranton, Pennsylvania, merchant M. J. Healey; Mary, a school teacher; Harriet, an Ursuline nun who lived and worked in Youngstown, Ohio; Eliza, the wife of locomotive construction superintendent Thomas F. Howley of Dunmore, Pennsylvania; and Kathryn, the wife of Erie Railroad agent John Creighton, of Caldwell, New Jersey.

On November 26, 1889, McAndrew married Nellie Elizabeth Roche of Scranton.  They were the parents of a daughter, Mary Aloysiz McAndrew, who died in 1908.

Awards
For his World War I service, McAndrew was a recipient of the Army Distinguished Service Medal, Knight Commander of the Order of St. Michael and St. George (Great Britain), Croix de Guerre with two Palms and Officer of the Legion of Honor (France), Grand Officer of the Order of the Crown (Belgium), Order of Saints Maurice and Lazarus and Order of the Crown of Italy (Italy), Order of Prince Danilo I (Montenegro), and Medal of La Solidaridad (Panama).

In 1918, McAndrew received the honorary degree of LL.D. from Fordham University.

References

Sources

Newspapers

Books

Internet

External links

1862 births
1922 deaths
United States Army Infantry Branch personnel
People from Wayne County, Pennsylvania
United States Military Academy alumni
United States Army Command and General Staff College alumni
United States Army War College alumni
United States Army generals
Recipients of the Distinguished Service Medal (US Army)
Knights Commander of the Order of St Michael and St George
Recipients of the Croix de Guerre 1914–1918 (France)
Officiers of the Légion d'honneur
Grand Officers of the Order of the Crown (Belgium)
Recipients of the Order of Saints Maurice and Lazarus
Burials at Arlington National Cemetery
United States Army generals of World War I
United States Army Command and General Staff College faculty
Xavier High School (New York City) alumni
Military personnel from Pennsylvania